Hoarwithy is a small village in the civil parish of Hentland, and on the River Wye in Herefordshire, England.

It is known for its church of St Catherine built in an Italian Romanesque style with detached campanile. The church, on a steep hillside above the village was built to a design by J. P. Seddon by  William Poole, the wealthy Vicar of Hentland in the 1870s.

The village has one public house, the New Harp Inn, which is adjacent to the River Wye.

External links

 Church and community site, includes location map
 Ross on Wye and Wye valley, including a page dedicated to St Catherine's Church, Hoarwithy
 Parish website

Villages in Herefordshire